Thomas Thorpe (1569–1635) was an English publisher.

Thomas Thorpe or Thorp may also refer to:
 Thomas Thorpe (fl. 1404), MP for Rutland (UK Parliament constituency)
 Thomas Thorpe (speaker) (died 1461), Speaker of the House of Commons in England
 Thomas Bangs Thorpe (1815–1878), American antebellum humorist and artist
 Thomas Edward Thorpe (1845–1925), British chemist
 Tom Thorpe (born 1993), English footballer
 Thomas Thorp (1925–2018), New Zealand judge
 Thomas Thorp (scientific instrument manufacturer) (1850–1914), English manufacturer of scientific instruments
 Tom Thorp (died 1942), American football player and coach, sports writer, and football and horse racing official
 Thomas Thorp (priest) (1797–1877), Archdeacon of Bristol
 Tommy Thorpe (1881–1953), English footballer and cricketer